The Umpqua Valley AVA is one of the first American Viticultural Area (AVA) in Oregon and located entirely within Douglas County, Oregon.  It became a sub-appellation within the larger Southern Oregon AVA when it was established in 2004. Its boundaries are detailed in Code of Federal Regulations, Title 27 Chapter I Part 9 section 89(C).  

Umpqua Valley includes two sub-appellations, the Red Hill Douglas County AVA and the Elkton Oregon AVA.

Grapes grown here include Pinot noir, Pinot gris, Tempranillo, Cabernet Sauvignon, Chardonnay, Riesling and more. 

The first post-prohibition estate winery in Oregon was established at HillCrest Vineyards in 1961, where the first Pinot Noir vines in Oregon were planted.  In 1995 the first Tempranillo vines in Oregon were planted at Abacela resulting in the first 100% varietal Tempranillo wines in the Pacific Northwest. The first commercial Grüner Veltliner in the U.S. was produced in the Umpqua Valley AVA by Reustle Prayer Rock Vineyards.

References

 
American Viticultural Areas
Oregon wine
Geography of Douglas County, Oregon
1984 establishments in Oregon